Walter A. Post (died February 12, 1912) was the first mayor of Newport News, Virginia. 

He was born in Kingston, New York on the 7th of January, 1857, and studied as a civil engineer.

He was sent to Newport News by his brother-in-law, Eugene White of Brooklyn, who had contracted with railroad magnate Collis P. Huntington to build a cargo terminal at the end of the newly built eastern terminus of the Chesapeake & Ohio Railway on the Virginia Peninsula, in 1880. 

When Newport News was chartered as an independent city in 1896, Post was chosen to serve as acting mayor until the city's first municipal elections could be held. On July 1 of that year, he was elected. Post chose to serve only one term as mayor, stepping down in 1898.

In 1911, he assumed the presidency of Newport News Shipbuilding & Dry Dock Company. He would hold that office until his death in 1912. The newspapers of the day attributed his death to "overwork", and heart failure. His entire time in Newport News was spent serving as a kind of lieutenant for Huntington, who essentially built the city of Newport News to serve his railroad.

Post Street in the Hilton Village historic district in Newport News is named after Post.

References

Mayors of Newport News, Virginia
1912 deaths